A list of films produced in Italy in 1976 (see 1976 in film):

References

Footnotes

Sources

External links
Italian films of 1976 at the Internet Movie Database

1976
Films
Lists of 1976 films by country or language